Love, Peace & Happiness is the fifth album from Christian R&B/Urban-Pop group Out of Eden. It was released in early 2004 and features hit singles such as "Soldiers" and the title track.

Track listing
Adapted from AllMusic.
Make Way (Lisa Kimmey, Mooki Taylor)
Just The Way (Lisa Kimmey, Mooki Taylor)
Love, Peace, And Happiness (Lisa Kimmey, Otto Price, Ric Robbins)
Soldiers (Lisa Kimmey, Kene "Ghost" Bell, Danielle Kimmey)
I Know (Lisa Kimmey, Victor Oquendo)
It's You (Lisa Kimmey, Mooki Taylor)
Should'a Listened (Lisa Kimmey, Todd Collins, Michael Ripoll)
Could've Been Me (Lisa Kimmey, Kene "Ghost" Bell)
Drama Free (Lisa Kimmey, Kene "Ghost" Bell, S. Appleton)
Tennessee Girls (Interlude)
Secret (Lisa Kimmey, Kene "Ghost" Bell)
Sincerely (Lisa Kimmey, Kene "Ghost" Bell, S. Appleton)

Charts

Personnel
From Allmusic.

Musicians
 Lisa Kimmey - Lead vocals, Background vocals
 Danielle Kimmey - Lead vocals, Background vocals
 Andrea Baca - Lead vocals, Background vocals
 Mr. Del - Rap
 Otto Price - Guitar, Bass
 Michael Ripoll - Guitar
 Andy Selby - Strings

Production
 Lisa Kimmey - Arranger, Producer, Executive Producer, Engineer
 TobyMac (aka Toby McKeehan) - Executive Producer
 Joey Elwood - Executive Producer
 Kene "Ghost" Bell - Arranger, Producer, Engineer
 Danielle Kimmey - Arranger, Producer
 Otto Price - Arranger, Producer
 Todd Collins - Producer, Engineer
 Mooki Taylor - Producer
 Ric Robbins - Producer
 Liquid Beats - Producer
 Incorporated Elements - Producer
 Marcelo Pennell - Engineer
 Steve Lotz - Engineer
 Serban Ghenea - Mixing
 Randy LeRoy - Mastering
 Eddy Boer - Creative Director
 Kwaku Alston - Photography
 Dawn Hayes - Stylist

References

2004 albums
Out of Eden albums
Gotee Records albums